Freak Show is the second studio album by Australian alternative rock band Silverchair. It was recorded during May–November 1996 and released on 4 February 1997 by record labels Murmur and Epic. It was nominated for the 1997 ARIA Music Award for Best Group, but lost to Savage Garden.

Recording and production 
Silverchair began recording their second studio album, Freak Show, in May 1996 while experiencing the success of their debut album, 1995's Frogstomp, in Australia and the US.

Freak Show was produced by Nick Launay (The Birthday Party, Models, Midnight Oil).

Content 
Frontman Daniel Johns described the album's title in 1997 by comparing the on-the-road life of Silverchair to that of a traveling carnival. The album's front cover image is an illustration of Grady Stiles, Jr., a sideshow performer afflicted with ectrodactyly, who used the stage name "Lobster Boy". The image is courtesy of Circus World Museum, Baraboo, Wisconsin.

Johns also stated that some of the lyrics were toned-down for release on Freak Show. Although, the majority of the songs found on the album still retain emotional and angst-fueled themes that include disease and suicide. One writer claimed the songs focused on the anger and backlash that the expectations of Frogstomp brought upon the band.

Many Freak Show songs such as "Slave", "Freak", "No Association", and "Nobody Came" were performed live two years prior to their release on the album.. Several of the songs also had different titles prior to the album's release. These include: "Cat and Mouse" ("The Closing"), "The Proxy Song" ("The Door"), and "Punk Song #1" ("Lie to Me"). A song entitled "Punk Song #2" was recorded but not renamed; it later appeared on the "Freak" single. "Punk Song #3" ("Satin Sheets") was originally recorded for Freak Show, but was omitted from the album and included on Neon Ballroom (1999) instead.

An unreleased song entitled "Slime" was recorded during the Freak Show sessions, but it has yet to be released. The existence of "Slime" can originally be traced back to the 1996 late October/early November European press release where it is listed amongst the rest of the Freak Show track listing. The song was described in the press release as "similar to 'No Association'" but "more melodic". Thematically speaking, it was described as the "linchpin" of the entire album.

Release 
Although Freak Show was shelved until February 1997 for the general public, European and Australian promotional pressings were officially circulated throughout the music press in late October/early November 1996. The release of Freak Show was originally slated for the autumn of 1996; it was later pushed back to avoid competition from Pearl Jam's No Code.

Freak Show was released on 4 February 1997. The album reached number 1 in the Australian charts and yielded three Top 10 singles – "Freak", "Abuse Me" and "Cemetery". Its fourth single, "The Door", reached No. 25. Freak Show was certified gold in the US, and 2× platinum in Australia.

The album was initially released on CD and limited edition cassette and 12-inch vinyl (coloured black in Australasia and yellow in Europe; limited to 3,000 copies worldwide). The CD release of Freak Show is an enhanced CD that includes interactive CD-ROM media from the making of the album. The material found on the Enhanced CD is accessed when placing the disc into the CD-ROM drive of a computer.

The Freak Box 

A limited-edition CD box set was released in 1997 by Murmur titled The Freak Box, and includes the four main singles from the album as well as a bonus CD containing interviews with the band members about the singles and their respective album.

Reception 

The German music magazine Rock Hard rated Freak Show 8.5/10. Along with the singles "Abuse Me" and "Freak", they praised the songs "No Association", "Learn to Hate" and "Roses", though "Nobody Came" was considered to be the song from Freak Show.		

Lorraine Ali of Rolling Stone wrote "Silverchair have loads of potential. The band may still be using other peoples' riffs to guide its post-pubescent fury, but it's the enthusiasm that makes this Freak Show more than a novelty."

American online magazine Loudwire considered Freak Show to be the 9th best hard rock album of 1997.

In his review for Freak Show, Stephen Thomas Erlewine, writing for AllMusic, wrote "Silverchair were slaves to their influences on their debut Frogstomp, but on their second album [...] they're beginning to show signs of developing their own style. While they may still concentrate too heavily on Pearl Jam and Nirvana, they're beginning to fuse the elements together in a more interesting way and are writing stronger hooks. Freak Show still has its share of mediocre moments [...] but the album shows potential that Frogstomp never did."

Chuck Eddy, writing for the American music magazine Spin, thought it was a better album than Silverchair's debut record Frogstomp, as Freak Show featured "punkier speedups, fancier breaks, and more dramatic climbing from quietude interlude to dude attitude". Spin also included "Abuse Me" at number 75 on its list "The 79 Best Alternative Rock Songs of 1997".

Jeff Gorra of Artist Waves wrote that Freak Show "truly showed how they had evolved as songwriters ... at just 17-years-old." The album's producer, Nick Launay, has said that Freak Show is his favourite Silverchair album. He said: During the recording of Freak Show they were incredibly wild and young, the energy and adrenaline in the room was like the biggest sugar rush imaginable. Craziest moment: Ben climbing inside a flight case with a movie camera being pushed down the long corridor at Festival Studios by the other two crashing into walls while filming from the inside. Result: black screen, shrieking screams, major damage to the walls.

In 2017, Josh Leeson, writing for The Newcastle Herald, wrote that "for many Chair fans the tortured anger of Freak Show remains a treasured edition in the catalogue of Newcastle's finest musical export" and that "20 years on it maintains its own freakish charm in body and soul."

Legacy and influence
In 2007, after explaining that he felt Neon Ballroom was Silverchair's "first album", Johns referred to Freak Show as "some kind of dark, high school band skeleton" in the band's "closet".

In 2017, The Brag wrote that the album stills hold up, "but in a different, lighter way". They also wrote that Freak Show is like "seeing your high school sweetheart many decades later – you don't feel the love, but you can remember how it felt. It's how music works sometimes. But it's enough that it works at all."

Australian musician Kevin Parker of Tame Impala has said that Freak Show is the album that made him want to make music and remains one of the most important albums in his life. He stated: I got into this album because my brothers were into it, they listened to a lot of grunge. That time, I was 10 or 11, was all about discovering rock music and realising how bad-ass it was. My brother had a drum kit and I started learning how to play. Actually, I started playing drums before I had the ambition to be in a band, but as soon as I fell in love with grunge that was all I wanted to do. Grunge gave me a sense of identity and I remember really associating with Silverchair, who were these chilled-out Australian teenagers. The fact that they were teenagers was a big deal for me. It was like: Oh man, you don't have to be a 30-year-old to do this.

Track listing

Personnel 

Silverchair
 Daniel Johns – vocals, guitars, sleeve art direction
 Ben Gillies – drums, timpani, percussion, sleeve art direction
 Chris Joannou – bass guitar, sleeve art direction

Additional personnel
 Jane Scarpantoni – cello on track 6, string arrangements on track 6
 Margaret Lindsay – cello on track 10
 Amanda Brown – violin on track 8
 Ian Cooper – violin on track 8
 Lorenza Ponce – violin on track 6
 Elizabeth Knowles – violin on track 6
 Todd Reynolds – violin on track 6
 David Mansfield – violin on track 6
 Ravi Kutilak – violin on track 10
 Matthew Pierce – viola on track 6
 Alan Parry – viola on track 6
 Rudi Crivici – viola on track 10
 Pandit Ran Chander Suman – tanpura and tabla on track 10
 Ruk Mali – sitar on track 10
 Daniel Denholm – string arrangements on track 10

Technical personnel
 Nick Launay – production, recording, mixing on "Petrol & Chlorine" and "The Closing", string arrangements on track 10
 Andy Wallace – mixing on all tracks except "Petrol & Chlorine" and "The Closing"
 Mark Thomas – engineering assistance (Sydney)
 Matt Lovell – engineering assistance (Sydney)
 Steve Sisco – engineering assistance (NYC)
 Bob Ludwig – mastering
 John Watson – sleeve art direction
 John O'Donnell – sleeve art direction
 Kevin Wilkins – sleeve art direction
 Sophie Howarth – sleeve photography
 Adrienne Overall & others – sleeve photography
 Lydia Kullik – cover art design

Charts and Certifications

Weekly charts

Year-end charts

Certifications

References

1997 albums
Silverchair albums
Murmur (record label) albums
Albums produced by Nick Launay